Zhongzheng District or Jhongjheng District is a district of Keelung City, Taiwan. The district is the city seat of Keelung City.

Geography
Zhongzheng District includes Hoping Island (和平島) and the nearby Keelung Islet, as well as the more distant Pengjia Islet, Mianhua Islet and Huaping Islet. Pingfong Rock, just east of Mianhua Islet, is the easternmost point under the actual control of Taiwan (ROC).

Administrative divisions
Zhongzheng District is made up of twenty-six urban villages:
 Deyi, Zhengyi/Jhengyi, Xinyi/Sinyi, Yizhong/Yijhong, Gangtong, Zhongchuan/Jhongchuan, Zhengchuan/Jhengchuan, Ruchuan, Zhongsha/Jhongsha, Zhengsha/Jhengsha, Zhensha/Jhensha, Shawan, Jianguo, Zhongbin/Jhongbin, Seashore (Haibin), Sheliao, Hexian/Hesian, Pingliao, Badou, Bisha, Changtan/Zhangtan, Shazi/Shazih, Zhongzheng/Jhongjheng, Zhengbin/Jhengbin, Xinfeng/Sinfong, Xinfu/Sinfu Village

Government institutions
 Keelung City Government
 Keelung City Council

Education
 National Taiwan Ocean University

Tourist attractions
 Badouzi Fishing Port
 Bisha Fishing Port
 Chung Cheng Park
 Ershawan Battery
 Heping Island Park
 Keelung City Indigenous Cultural Hall
 Keelung Cultural Center
 Keelung Fort Commander's Official Residence
 National Museum of Marine Science and Technology
 Pengjia Lighthouse
 Chaur Jing park
 Erhsha Bay Battery
 Padouzi Seashore Park
 Peace Island Park

Transportation
 Badouzi Station

Notable natives
 Chang Tong-rong, Mayor of Keelung City (2007–2014)
 Wang Tuoh, Minister of Council for Cultural Affairs (2008)

See also
 List of Taiwanese superlatives

References

Districts of Keelung